Merrill Lake is a lake in the U.S. state of Washington.

Merrill Lake was named after the father-in-law of a first settler.

See also
List of lakes in Washington

References

Lakes of Cowlitz County, Washington
Lakes of Washington (state)